Ditte, Child of Man,, is a 1946 socio-realistic Danish drama directed by Bjarne Henning-Jensen based on the novel by Martin Andersen Nexø. The film stars Tove Maës in the tragic story of an impoverished young girl who becomes the victim of harsh social conditions. The film has been noted as the first example of the more realistic and serious Danish film in the post-World War II era. Ditte, Child of Man is one of the ten films listed in Denmark's cultural canon by the Danish Ministry of Culture.

Story
Ditte (Tove Maës), born illegitimately, is deserted as a young girl by her alcoholic mother Sørine (Karen Lykkehus). She moves in with her grandparents Maren (Karen Poulsen) and Søren Mand (Rasmus Ottesen). But after Søren dies, it is Ditte who becomes the old woman's only support. It is the small girl's deepest sorrow that she has no father, so she is pleased when she hears that Lars Peter (Edwin Tiemroth) will marry her mother and they will all live together. However, it is Ditte who becomes like a mother to Lars Peter's three small children. Their poverty is so oppressive, it drives Ditte's mother to kill Maren, and Sørine is sent away to prison. Ditte, despite her young age, must assume all of the household's responsibilities. As time passes, a warm relationship develops between Ditte and Lars Peter. One day, Lars Peter's brother Johannes (Ebbe Rode) appears. Johannes is a poor knife and scissors sharpener who informs them of his big business schemes, however, his schemes bring nothing but disappointment. Lars moves away and Ditte must find herself a job. Ditte takes a job as a servant on a rural farm. The farm owner's weak-willed son Karl (Preben Neergard), who is completely controlled by his mother (Maria Garland), falls in love with Ditte and they develop a happy romance. However, when Ditte becomes pregnant, Karl does nothing while his mother forces Ditte to leave the farm. Deeply distraught, Ditte searches after Lars Peter, the only parental figure who ever showed her kindness and understanding. Ditte discovers her mother has been paroled from prison and Ditte begins a new life—forgiving and caring for her mother—at the same time that she becomes the mother of her own illegitimate child.

Cast
 
Tove Maës as Ditte
Karen Poulsen as the Grandmother
Rasmus Ottesen as the Grandfather
Karen Lykkehus  as Ditte's Mother
Jette Kehlet as Ditte when she was a girl
Edvin Tiemroth as Lars Peter
Kai Holm as  Innkeeper
Maria Garland as Karl's Mother
Preben Neergaard as Karl
Henny Lindorff Buckhøj as Sine the maid
Ebbe Langberg as Christian Ditte's brother
Lars Henning-Jensen as Paul Ditte's brother
Hanne Juhl as Ditte's sister
Per Buckhøj as Head Clerk
Valsø Holm as Johansen the dayworker

Reception
Danish film historian Ib Monty wrote that Ditte, Child of Man, in its harsh portrayal of social conditions was the first example of the realistic serious Danish film. It followed the growing trend in contemporary European cinema during the post-war period after World War II. Monty wrote that the film "was a tremendous success in Denmark and it also won a certain international recognition." However, film reviewers in the United States (where the movie was seen in an edited version which removed any nudity) dismissed the movie as being too broad and melodramatic. Maes in a later interview replied that people there hadn't yet been confronted with poverty in such a realistic portrayal.

References

External links
 
Ditte Menneskebarn, at Den Danske Film Database (In Danish)
Ditte Menneskebarn Det Danske Filminstitut (In Danish)
 

1940s Danish-language films
1946 films
Films directed by Bjarne Henning-Jensen
Danish drama films
1946 drama films
Danish Culture Canon
Films scored by Poul Schierbeck
Films based on Danish novels
Danish black-and-white films